This is a list of films produced in Pakistan in 2005 (see 2005 in film) and in the Urdu language.

2005

See also
2005 in Pakistan

External links
 Search Pakistani film - IMDB.com
 List of Films - pakmag.net

2005
Pakistani
Films